Pichonia is a group of trees in the Sapotaceae described as a genus in 1890.

Pichonia is native to New Caledonia, New Guinea and nearby Islands in Indonesia and Papuasia.

Species

References

Chrysophylloideae
Sapotaceae genera